Peter Levitt (born September 2, 1946 in New York City) is a poet and translator. He is also the founder and teacher of the Salt Spring Zen Circle, in the Soto Zen lineage of Shunryu Suzuki-Roshi.

Background
He has taught poetry, writing and creativity workshops and seminars around the world, including at the C. G. Jung Institute of Los Angeles, Naropa Institute Jack Kerouac School of Disembodied Poetics, and as a faculty member in poetry and translation for the MFA Writers Program at Antioch University.  He emigrated to Canada in 2000 and became a citizen shortly thereafter.  He is an instructor in the University of British Columbia Creative Writing Optional Residency MFA Program.  He was in the anthology and film, Poets Against the War. He was at the 2009 Montreal Zen Poetry Festival.

He lives with his wife, poet Shirley Graham, and their son, Tai, on one of the Gulf Islands in British Columbia.

Awards
 1989 Lannan Foundation Literary Award in Poetry
 2004 Canada Council for the Arts

Work

Poetry

 
 
 
 
 
 
 
 
 
 ; Blissful Monkey Press 2011 (Second Edition)

Essays

Editor / Translator
 
 
 
 
Kazuaki Tanahashi (August 2010) Shobo Genzo: Zen Master Dogen's Treasury of the True Dharma Eye, associate editor, Peter Levitt
 The Essential Dogen: Writings of the Great Zen Master  (Shambhala Publications, April 2013) edited by Peter Levitt and Kazuaki Tanahashi
The Complete Cold Mountain: Poems of the Legendary Hermit Hanshan. (Shambhala Publications, 2018) Translated by Kazuaki Tanahashi and Peter Levitt

References

External links
Author's website; bio
An Interview with Peter Levitt, Kathryn Pope, zinkville
"Peter Levitt Book Launch", The Grapevine, UBC

Academic staff of the University of British Columbia
20th-century Canadian poets
Canadian male poets
Antioch University faculty
1946 births
Living people
20th-century Canadian male writers